James Waddell Smith (born August 24, 1955 in New Orleans, Louisiana) was an American-born football player for the Edmonton Eskimos of the Canadian Football League (CFL) where he played for seven seasons from 1977 to 1983. He was an All-Star in 1979 and was a part of five Grey Cup championship teams for the Eskimos. He finished his career in the NFL playing two games for the Dallas Cowboys in 1984.

References

1955 births
Living people
American players of Canadian football
Canadian football wide receivers
Dallas Cowboys players
Edmonton Elks players
Kansas Jayhawks football players
Players of American football from New Orleans
Players of Canadian football from New Orleans